Gaius Aemilius Mamercus was a Roman statesman who may have served as Dictator in 463 BC.

Historical divergence
No dictator is listed for this year in the fasti consulares, but Lydus says that there was a Dictator in the forty-eighty year of the republic. Bendel links this with the story that the senate appointed a Dictator clavi figendi causa in 363 BC because that had worked to stop a pestilence a century earlier and concludes that Mamercus was this Dictator. Broughton sees this as an insufficient reason to say that Mamercus was dictator in 463 BC, and suggests that Lydus has confused a Dictator with an Interrex.

References

Ancient Roman dictators
5th-century BC Romans
Mamercus
Year of birth unknown
Year of death unknown